Night at the Concord Pavilion is a 1990 live album by the American jazz singer Mel Tormé.

Track listing 
 "Sing for Your Supper"/"Sing Sing Sing"/"Sing (Sing a Song)" (Richard Rodgers, Lorenz Hart)/(Louis Prima)/(Joe Raposo) 	
 "You Make Me Feel So Young" (Mack Gordon, Josef Myrow) 	
 "Early Autumn" (Ralph Burns, Woody Herman, Johnny Mercer)
 Guys and Dolls medley: "Guys and Dolls"/"Fugue for Tinhorns"/"The Oldest Established"/"If I Were a Bell"/"My Time of Day"/"I've Never Been in Love Before"/"Sit Down, You're Rockin' the Boat"/"Luck Be a Lady"
 "I Could Have Told You"/"Losing My Mind"/"Deep in a Dream"/"Goin' Out of My Head" (Carl Sigman, Jimmy Van Heusen)/(Stephen Sondheim)/(Eddie DeLange, Van Heusen)/(Teddy Randazzo, Bobby Weinstein)		
 "Too Darn Hot" (Cole Porter) 	
 "Day In, Day Out" (Rube Bloom, Mercer) 	
 "Down for Double" (Freddie Green)	
 "You're Driving Me Crazy" (Walter Donaldson)	
 "Sent for You Yesterday (and Here You Come Today)" (Count Basie, Eddie Durham, Jimmy Rushing)

All music and lyrics on track four written by Frank Loesser.

Personnel 
 Mel Tormé - vocals
 John Campbell - piano
 Bob Maize - double bass
 Donny Osborne - drums
Frank Wess–Harry Edison big band
 Frank Wess - tenor saxophone
 Harry "Sweets" Edison - trumpet
 Joe Newman
 Ray Brown
 Pete Minger
 Al Grey - trombone
 Grover Mitchell
 Benny Powell
 Curtis Peagler - alto saxophone
 Marshal Royal
 Billy Mitchell - tenor saxophone
 Bill Ramsay - baritone saxophone
 Ted Dunbar - guitar

References 

Concord Records live albums
Mel Tormé live albums
1990 live albums
albums produced by Carl Jefferson